Mastoorah is a village next to Rabigh in the area of Hijaz in the western part of Saudi Arabia.  It is located between Mecca and Medina and has population of Harb tribes.

References

Populated places in Mecca Province